The Wilfrid Laurier Golden Hawks women's ice hockey team is the women's college ice hockey team that represents the Wilfrid Laurier University in Waterloo, Ontario. The team competes as a member of the Ontario University Athletics (OUA), under the U Sports association. The Golden Hawks play their home games at Sunlife Financial Arena. 

Since joining the OUA in the 1994-95 season, the team has won 11 OUA provincial titles and 1 U Sports national title (2004-05).

The current coach is former New Hampshire Wildcats Hockey East All-Star forward Kelly Paton, who took over in 2018. Also a former player for the Boston Blades, Paton had previously coached the Western Mustangs women's hockey team as well as the London Devilettes of the Provincial Women’s Hockey League. 

Prior to Paton, the head coach was Rick Osborne. Osborne joined the team in 2003 and brought the team to 9 provincial championships and the only national title they have won. He retired after 15 seasons.

History
The Laurier women's ice hockey program began in the 1994-95 season and since the 1998-99 season has dominated women's hockey in the OUA Ontario University Athletics. They have been champions 10 times since that 1998 season. Winning the OUA championship in 1998/99, 2001/02, 2003/04, 2004/05, 2005/06, 2006/07, 2007/08, 2008/09, 2009/10, and 2011/12 seasons.

Awards and honours 

Forward - Andrea Ironside, 2008/2009 Women's Hockey U Sports Championship Tournament All-Star
Forward - Andrea Ironside, Monday, November 24, 2008, Laurier Athlete of the Week
Goaltender - Liz Knox, 2010 Outstanding Woman of Laurier
Defence - Andrea Bevan, 2006/2007 Women's Hockey OUA Most Valuable Player
Defence - Andrea Bevan, 2008/2009 Women's Hockey OUA Most Valuable Player

U Sports honours
Defence - Andrea Bevan, 2004/2005 U Sports Women's Hockey All Rookie Team
Defence - Andrea Bevan, 2006/2007 U Sports Women's Hockey First Team All-Canadian
Defence - Andrea Bevan, 2006/2007 U Sports Tournament All-Star
Defence - Andrea Bevan, 2007/2008 U Sports Women's Hockey First Team All-Canadian
Defence - Andrea Bevan, 2008/2009 U Sports Women's Hockey First Team All-Canadian
Forward - Andrea Ironside, 2009 Second Team
Forward - Andrea Ironside, 2010 U Sports Tournament All-Star
Goaltender - Liz Knox, 2010 Brodrick Trophy, U Sports MVP
Goaltender - Liz Knox, 2010 All-U Sports First Team
Defence - Alannah Wakefield, 2011 U Sports all-rookie team

U Sports Tournament honours
Laurissa Kenworthy, 2007 U Sports Tournament All-Stars

Academic All-Canadian honours
Kate Psota (2009)

All-Canadian honours
Defence -Andrea Bevan, 2004/2005 U Sports Women's Hockey All Rookie Team
Defence - Andrea Bevan, 2006/2007 U Sports Women's Hockey First Team All-Canadian
Defence - Andrea Bevan, 2007/2008 U Sports Women's Hockey First Team All-Canadian
Defence - Andrea Bevan, 2008/2009 U Sports Women's Hockey First Team All-Canadian
Forward - Andrea Ironside, 2009 Second Team
Defence - Alannah Wakefield, 2011 U Sports all-rookie team

OUA honours
Andrea Bevan, 2006/2007 Women's Hockey OUA Most Valuable Player
Andrea Bevan, 2008/2009 Women's Hockey OUA Most Valuable Player
Andrea Bevan, 2008/2009 Women's Hockey OUA First Team All-Star
Andrea Ironside, 2008/2009 Women's Hockey OUA First Team All-Star
Alicia Martin, 20011/2012 Women's Hockey OUA First Team All-Star

Golden Hawks in pro hockey

International
Andrea Bevan : 2009 Winter Universiade  
Andrea Ironside : 2009 Winter Universiade 
Liz Knox : 2011 Winter Universiade 
Alicia Martin: 2011 Winter Universiade 
Laura Brooker : 2015 Winter Universiade

References

Wilfrid Laurier University
U Sports women's ice hockey teams
Women's ice hockey teams in Canada
Ice hockey teams in Ontario
Wilfrid Laurier Golden Hawks
Women in Ontario
1994 establishments in Ontario
Ice hockey clubs established in 1994